Jesus son of Damneus (Greek: Ἰησοῦς του Δαμναίου, Hebrew: ישוע בן דמנאי, Yeshua` ben Damnai) was a Herodian-era High Priest of Judaea in Jerusalem, Iudaea Province. 

In the Antiquities of the Jews (Book 20, Chapter 9) first-century historian Josephus states that Jesus ben Damneus was made high priest after the previous high priest, Ananus son of Ananus, was removed from his position for executing James the brother of Jesus of Nazareth (James the Just). This occurred after a large number of Jews complained and petitioned the king. Jesus ben Damneus himself was deposed less than a year later. 

While the authenticity of some passages in Book 18 of Antiquities of the Jews has been subject to debate, the overwhelming majority of scholars consider the discussion of the death of James in Section 9 of Book 20 to be authentic.

The works of Josephus refer to at least twenty different people with the name Jesus, and in chapter 9 of Book 20, and scholars agree that Jesus the son of Damneus is distinct from the reference to "Jesus called Christ", who is mentioned along with the identification of James. John Painter states that phrase "who was called Christ" is used by Josephus in this passage "by way of distinguishing him from others of the same name such as the high priest Jesus son of Damneus, or Jesus son of Gamaliel" both having been mentioned by Josephus in this context.

See also 
 Sources for the historicity of Jesus
 Historical Jesus

References 

1st-century High Priests of Israel